Annette Hohn (born 22 November 1966 in Schwerin) is a German rower.

References 
 
 

1966 births
Living people
German female rowers
Sportspeople from Schwerin
Rowers at the 1992 Summer Olympics
Olympic bronze medalists for Germany
Olympic rowers of Germany
Olympic medalists in rowing
World Rowing Championships medalists for Germany
Medalists at the 1992 Summer Olympics
20th-century German women
21st-century German women